The Fridolin Arnault House is located in Wood-Ridge, Bergen County, New Jersey, United States. The house was added to the National Register of Historic Places on December 23, 2009. The Wood-Ridge Historical Society is headquartered in this house.

See also 

 National Register of Historic Places listings in Bergen County, New Jersey

References

Houses on the National Register of Historic Places in New Jersey
Houses in Bergen County, New Jersey
National Register of Historic Places in Bergen County, New Jersey
Wood-Ridge, New Jersey
New Jersey Register of Historic Places